Hermann Hagedorn (18 July 1882 – 27 July 1964) was an American author, poet and biographer.

Life and career 
He was born in New York City and educated at The Hill School and Harvard University, where he was awarded the George B. Sohier Prize for literature, the University of Berlin, and Columbia University. From 1909 to 1911, he was an instructor in English at Harvard.

Hagedorn was a friend and biographer of Theodore Roosevelt. He also served as Secretary and Director of the Theodore Roosevelt Association from 1919 to 1957.  Drawing upon his friendship with Roosevelt, Hagedorn was able to elicit the support of Roosevelt's friends and associates' personal recollections in his biography of TR which was first published in 1918 and then updated in 1922 and which is oriented toward children. The book has a summary questions for young readers at the end of each chapter. Drawing on the same friends and associates of Roosevelt, Hagedorn also published the first serious study of TR's experience as a rancher in the Badlands after the death of his wife and mother in 1884. Hagedorn's access to TR's associates in these two books has been utilized by historian, Edmund Morris in his three highly acclaimed biographical books on Roosevelt: The Rise of Theodore Roosevelt, Theodore Rex, and Colonel Roosevelt.

Selected works 
 The Silver Blade (1907)  
 The Woman of Corinth (1908)  
 A Troop of the Guard, and other Poems (1909)  
 Poems and Ballads (1912)  
 Faces in the Dawn (1914)  
 You are the Hope of the World (1917, 1920)  
 Theodore Roosevelt (1918, 1922)  
 That Human Being, Leonard Wood (1920)  
 Roosevelt in the Bad Lands (1921)
 The three pharaohs: a dramatic poem, John Day (1932)
 The Magnate: William Boyce Thompson and his Time (1935)
 Combat at Midnight: A Book of Poems (1940)
 Sunward I've Climbed, The Story of John Magee, Poet and Soldier, 1922–1941 (1942)
 The Bomb That Fell on America (1946)
 Americans: A Book of Lives (1946)
 Prophet in the Wilderness: The Story of Albert Schweitzer (1947)
 The Roosevelt Family of Sagamore Hill (1954)
 The Theodore Roosevelt Treasury (1957)

References

This article incorporates text from a publication now in the public domain: Gilman, D. C.; Peck, H. T.; Colby, F. M., eds. (1905). "Hermann Hagedorn." New International Encyclopedia'' (1st ed.). New York: Dodd, Mead.

External links
 
 
 
 http://library.syr.edu/digital/guides/h/hagedorn_h.htm Biographical History of Herman Hagedorn
Hermann Hagedorn Papers. Yale Collection of American Literature, Beinecke Rare Book and Manuscript Library.

1882 births
1964 deaths
20th-century American biographers
American male biographers
American male poets
The Hill School alumni
Columbia University alumni
Harvard University alumni
Harvard University faculty
Place of death missing
20th-century American poets
20th-century American male writers
20th-century American non-fiction writers